In mathematics, the adjoint representation (or adjoint action) of a Lie group G is a way of representing the elements of the group as linear transformations of the group's Lie algebra, considered as a vector space.

For any Lie group, this natural representation is obtained by linearizing (i.e. taking the differential of) the action of G on itself by conjugation. The adjoint representation can be defined for linear algebraic groups over arbitrary fields.

Definition

Let G be a Lie group, and let

be the mapping ,  
with Aut(G) the automorphism group of G and  given by the inner automorphism (conjugation)

This Ψ is a Lie group homomorphism.

Moreover, since  is a group homomorphism,  too is a group homomorphism. Hence, the map

is a group representation called the adjoint representation of G.

If G is an immersed Lie subgroup of the general linear group  (called immersely linear Lie group), then the Lie algebra  consists of matrices and the exponential map is the matrix exponential  for matrices X with small operator norms.

where on the right we have the products of matrices.

Succinctly, an adjoint representation is an isotropy representation associated to the conjugation action of G around the identity element of G.

Derivative of Ad
One may always pass from a representation of a Lie group G to a representation of its Lie algebra by taking the derivative at the identity.

Taking the derivative of the adjoint map

at the identity element gives the adjoint representation of the Lie algebra  of G:

One can show that

for all , where the right hand side is given (induced) by the Lie bracket of vector fields.

where  denotes the flow generated by X. As it turns out, roughly because both sides satisfy the same ODE defining the flow. On the other hand, since , by chain rule,

as Y is left-invariant. Hence,
,
which is what was needed to show.

Ad and ad are related through the exponential map: Specifically, Adexp(x) = exp(adx) for all x in the Lie algebra. It is a consequence of the general result relating Lie group and Lie algebra homomorphisms via the exponential map.

.
.
The general case can also be deduced from the linear case: indeed, let  be an immersely linear Lie group having the same Lie algebra as that of G. Then the derivative of Ad at the identity element for G and that for G coincide; hence, without loss of generality, G can be assumed to be G.

The upper-case/lower-case notation is used extensively in the literature. Thus, for example, a vector     in the algebra  generates a vector field     in the group  .

Further see the derivative of the exponential map.

Adjoint representation of a Lie algebra 
Let  be a Lie algebra over some field.

It is called the adjoint endomorphism or adjoint action. Since a bracket is bilinear, this determines the linear mapping

Within End, the bracket is, by definition, given by the commutator of the two operators:

where  denotes composition of linear maps. Using the above definition of the bracket, the Jacobi identity
 
takes the form 

This last identity says that ad is a Lie algebra homomorphism; i.e., a linear mapping that takes brackets to brackets. Hence, ad is a representation of a Lie algebra and is called the adjoint representation of the algebra .

If  is finite-dimensional and a basis for it is chosen, then  is the Lie algebra of square matrices and the composition corresponds to matrix multiplication.

In a more module-theoretic language, the construction says that  is a module over itself.

When  is the Lie algebra of a Lie group G, ad is the differential of Ad at the identity element of G.

There is the following formula similar to the Leibniz formula: for scalars  and Lie algebra elements ,

Structure constants 

The explicit matrix elements of the adjoint representation are given by the structure constants of the algebra. That is, let {ei} be a set of basis vectors for the algebra, with 

Then the matrix elements for 
adei
are given by

Thus, for example, the adjoint representation of su(2) is the defining representation of so(3).

Examples 
If G is abelian of dimension n, the adjoint representation of G is the trivial n-dimensional representation.
If G is a matrix Lie group (i.e. a closed subgroup of ), then its Lie algebra is an algebra of n×n matrices with the commutator for a Lie bracket (i.e. a subalgebra of ). In this case, the adjoint map is given by Adg(x) = gxg−1.
If G is SL(2, R) (real 2×2 matrices with determinant 1), the Lie algebra of G consists of real 2×2 matrices with trace 0.  The representation is equivalent to that given by the action of G by linear substitution on the space of binary (i.e., 2 variable) quadratic forms.

Properties

The following table summarizes the properties of the various maps mentioned in the definition

The image of G under the adjoint representation is denoted by Ad(G). If G is connected, the kernel of the adjoint representation coincides with the kernel of Ψ which is just the center of G. Therefore, the adjoint representation of a connected Lie group G is faithful if and only if G is centerless. More generally, if G is not connected, then the kernel of the adjoint map is the centralizer of the identity component G0 of G. By the first isomorphism theorem we have

Now, if  is the Lie algebra of a connected Lie group G, then  is the image of the adjoint representation of G: .

Roots of a semisimple Lie group 
If G is semisimple, the non-zero weights of the adjoint representation form a root system. (In general, one needs to pass to the complexification of the Lie algebra before proceeding.)  To see how this works, consider the case G = SL(n, R). We can take the group of diagonal matrices diag(t1, ..., tn) as our maximal torus T.  Conjugation by an element of T sends

Thus, T acts trivially on the diagonal part of the Lie algebra of G and with eigenvectors titj−1 on the various off-diagonal entries.  The roots of G are the weights diag(t1, ..., tn) → titj−1.  This accounts for the standard description of the root system of G = SLn(R) as the set of vectors of the form ei−ej.

Example SL(2, R) 
When computing the root system for one of the simplest cases of Lie Groups, the group SL(2, R) of two dimensional matrices with determinant 1 consists of the set of matrices of the form:

 

with a, b, c, d real and ad − bc = 1.

A maximal compact connected abelian Lie subgroup, or maximal torus T, is given by the subset of all matrices of the form

 

The Lie algebra of the maximal torus is the Cartan subalgebra consisting of the matrices

 

If we conjugate an element of SL(2, R) by an element of the maximal torus we obtain

 

The matrices

 

are then 'eigenvectors' of the conjugation operation with eigenvalues . The function Λ which gives  is a multiplicative character, or homomorphism from the group's torus to the underlying field R. The function λ giving θ is a weight of the Lie Algebra with weight space given by the span of the matrices.

It is satisfying to show the multiplicativity of the character and the linearity of the weight. It can further be proved that the differential of Λ can be used to create a weight. It is also educational to consider the case of SL(3, R).

Variants and analogues 
The adjoint representation can also be defined for algebraic groups over any field.

The co-adjoint representation is the contragredient representation of the adjoint representation.  Alexandre Kirillov observed that the orbit of any vector in a co-adjoint representation is a symplectic manifold.  According to the philosophy in representation theory known as the orbit method (see also the Kirillov character formula), the irreducible representations of a Lie group G should be indexed in some way by its co-adjoint orbits. This relationship is closest in the case of nilpotent Lie groups.

See also

Notes

References

 .

Representation theory of Lie groups
Lie groups